Vasso Papandreou (born 31 July 1944 in Valimitika) is a Greek politician. After being in exile during the rule of the Greek junta, she returned to Greece in 1974 and was a founding member of PASOK.  In 1981 she was awarded a PhD in economics from the University of Reading.

She was a member of PASOK's  Central Committee until 1988, and served as Deputy Minister of Industry, Energy and Technology 1986 to 1987 and as Deputy Minister of Commerce in 1988.

In 1989, she was appointed as Greece's European Commissioner, taking the post of Commissioner for 
 Employment, industrial relations and social affairs in the second Delors Commission.  After her term on the commission, she returned to Greek domestic politics and was elected to the Hellenic Parliament in the 1993, 1996 and 2000 elections. She served in the Third Cabinet of Prime Minister Costas Simitis as Minister for the Interior from 2000 to 2001, and then as Minister for the Environment, Physical Planning and Public Works from 2001 to 2004.

References 

1944 births
Living people
Alumni of the University of Reading
PASOK politicians
Government ministers of Greece
Women government ministers of Greece
Ministers of the Interior of Greece
Environment ministers of Greece
Greek MPs 1993–1996
Greek MPs 1996–2000
Greek MPs 2000–2004
Women members of the Hellenic Parliament
Greek European Commissioners
European Commissioners 1989–1992
Women European Commissioners
People from Aigio